Darwinia virescens, commonly known as Murchison darwinia, is a species of flowering plant in the family Myrtaceae and is endemic to a small area on the west coast of Western Australia near Geraldton. It is a prostrate or low-lying shrub with crowded linear leaves and dense, hemispherical heads of green, yellow or red flowers.

Description
Each flower is on a thick, top-shaped pedicel. Flowering occurs from August to December.

Taxonomy and naming
This species was first formally described in 1857 by Carl Meissner, who gave it the name Genetyllis virescens in the Journal of the Proceedings of the Linnean Society, Botany. In 1867, George Bentham changed the name to Darwinia virescens. The specific epithet (virescens) is a Latin word meaning "growing green or verdant".

Distribution and habitat
Murchison Darwinia grows in sandy heath in the Geraldton Sandplains and Yalgoo biogeographic regions of Western Australia.

Conservation status
Darwinia virescens is listed as "not threatened" by the Government of Western Australia Department of Biodiversity, Conservation and Attractions.

Ecology
The flowers of Darwinia virescens (and of Darwinia sanguinea) are held at ground level and there is speculation that this suggests that they are pollinated by mammals.

References

virescens
Endemic flora of Western Australia
Rosids of Western Australia
Myrtales of Australia
Plants described in 1857
Taxa named by George Bentham
Taxa named by Carl Meissner